Yan Zi and Zheng Jie were the defending champions but lost in the semifinals to Chan Yung-jan and Chuang Chia-jung
Cara Black and Liezel Huber  won the title, defeating Chan Yung-jan and Chuang Chia-jung in the final 6–4, 6–74, 6–1

Seeds

 Lisa Raymond /  Samantha Stosur (semifinals)
 Yan Zi /  Zheng Jie (semifinals)
 Cara Black /  Liezel Huber (champions)
 Virginia Ruano Pascual /  Paola Suárez (first round)
 Dinara Safina /  Katarina Srebotnik (third round)
 Daniela Hantuchová /  Ai Sugiyama (quarterfinals)
 Anna-Lena Grönefeld /  Meghann Shaughnessy (quarterfinals)
 Nathalie Dechy /  Vera Zvonareva (third round)
 Corina Morariu /  Rennae Stubbs (first round)
 Anabel Medina Garrigues /  Sania Mirza (third round)
 Marion Bartoli /  Shahar Pe'er (first round)
 Maria Elena Camerin  Gisela Dulko (third round)
 Elena Likhovtseva  Elena Vesnina (first round)
 Elena Dementieva /  Flavia Pennetta (third round)
 Janette Husárová /  Jelena Janković (first round)
 Eleni Daniilidou   Jasmin Wöhr (third round)

Draw

Finals

Top half

Section 1

Section 2

Bottom half

Section 3

Section 4

External links
 2007 Australian Open – Women's draws and results at the International Tennis Federation
 Draw

Women's Doubles
Australian Open (tennis) by year – Women's doubles
2007 in Australian women's sport